SSX4 can refer to:
 SSX on Tour, a skiing and snowboarding video game
 SSX4 (gene), the gene that encodes Protein SSX4